Exocentrus punctipennis is a species of longhorn beetles of the subfamily Lamiinae. It was described by Mulsant and Guillebeu in 1856, and is known from southern Europe and the Caucasus. The beetles inhabit elm trees.

References

Beetles described in 1856
Beetles of Europe
Acanthocinini